Desert Justice is a 1936 American western film directed by William Berke and starring Jack Perrin, Warren Hymer and David Sharpe.

Synopsis
When the police commissioner orders all police horses to be sold off, officer Jack Rankin is disappointed but his beloved Starlight is bought for him by a woman whose life he has saved. Soon afterwards a bank robbery is carried out by a gang headed by Jack's younger brother Dave.

Cast
 Jack Perrin as Jack Rankin
 Warren Hymer as Hymie
 Marion Dowling as Ellen Hansen 
 David Sharpe as Dave Rankin 
 Roger Williams as 	Rod
 William Gould as 	Hugo Cohn - Auctioneer
 Fred 'Snowflake' Toones as 	Snowflake - Bank Janitor 
 Dennis Moore as Motorcycle Officer 
 Budd Buster as 	Rod's Henchman
 Earl Dwire as Hansen - Police Commissioner
 Tex Palmer as Posseman 
 Braveheart as	Braveheart - Ellen's Dog
 Starlight the Horse as Starlight - Jack's Horse

References

Bibliography
 Pitts, Michael R. Poverty Row Studios, 1929–1940. McFarland & Company, 2005.

External links
 

1936 films
1936 Western (genre) films
American Western (genre) films
Films directed by William A. Berke
American black-and-white films
1930s English-language films
1930s American films